Hwangudan Altar, located in Jung-gu, Seoul, South Korea, was built in 1897 to serve as a site for the performance of the rite of heaven.  The site was also known by other names, such as Wongudan (원구단), Jecheondan (제천단) and Wondan (원단). Hwangudan was designated South Korea's Historic Site No. 157 on July 15, 1967.

History
Korean monarchs sacrificed to Heaven during the Three Kingdoms and Goryeo periods. The practice was Confucianized with the adoption of the round altar ritual by Seongjong of Goryeo in 983. The round altar ritual was restricted to Sons of Heaven. Goryeo monarchs sacrificed to Heaven until 1385; they sacrificed to Heaven during the period of Mongol domination in Korea.

King Sejo of Joseon briefly restarted the rite but stopped the practice in the tenth year of his reign in 1464 because the rite could only be performed by the son of heaven - the Ming emperor and Joseon was a tributary state to Ming. The ritual was restarted again when King Gojong proclaimed the Korean Empire in 1897 after the First Sino-Japanese War, but it was subsequently abolished by the Japanese colonial government in 1910. The Gocheonje ritual was revived in 2002 with the intention of annual performance as a revival of Korean cultural heritage.

Architecture

Hwangudan was built in 1897 following the Ming ritual tradition. The site of the complex sat between Namsan and Bukhansan, and was considered highly auspicious by geomancers.  The altar complex was also designed to mimic natural elements such as the sun and moon.  It was a three-story altar made of granite and was used for animal sacrifice. The top center of the altar held a conical yellow-roofed building. The altar was destroyed by the Japanese in 1913. 

Today, the Hwanggungu (hwang-gung-u, 皇穹宇, Imperial Vault of Heaven), a three-storied octagonal shrine built in 1899, remains at the site. The Hwanggungu, built on the north side of the altar complex, was designed for the worship of Heaven and respecting Taejo, the founder of Joseon. Along with the Hwanggungu, there are several other surviving relics such as the three stone drums (Seokgodan, 石鼓壇) featuring dragon decorations completed in 1902 to commemorate the 40th anniversary of Gojong's enthronement, the gate leading to Hwanggungu, and the main entrance into the complex. 

The imperial Japanese built the Railroad Chosen Hotel in the area where they had demolished Hwangudan Altar. The Hwanggungu still stands in the hotel complex today and although it is not a well known tourist site, it is popular with the guests of the hotel.

Gallery

See also
 Temple of Heaven, Beijing
 Seoul Sajikdan
 Korean Empire

References

External links
 Cultural Heritage Online: Hwangudan
 Seoul, Jung-gu Culture & Tourism 
 Asian Historical Architecture: Hwangudan Altar
 http://san-shin.org/TOH-1.html
 An image of the old Hwangudan Altar

Jung District, Seoul
Buildings and structures in Seoul
Tourist attractions in Seoul
Korean Confucianism
Korean Empire